Reginald Walter Seedsman (10 November 1895 – 2 March 1983) was an Australian rules footballer who played with South Melbourne in the Victorian Football League (VFL).

Notes

External links 

1895 births
1983 deaths
Australian rules footballers from Victoria (Australia)
Sydney Swans players